Glenn Walter "Wally" Diehl (January 1, 1905 – May 29, 1954) was a professional American football fullback in the National Football League. He played three seasons for the Frankford Yellow Jackets (1928–1930).

External links
Bucknell Athletics Hall of Fame bio

1905 births
1954 deaths
People from Mount Carmel, Pennsylvania
Players of American football from Pennsylvania
American football fullbacks
Bucknell Bison football players
Frankford Yellow Jackets players
Frankford Yellow Jackets coaches
Delaware Fightin' Blue Hens football coaches